Muriel Agnes Heagney (1885 – 1974) was an Australian trade unionist and feminist and lifetime campaigner for equal pay for women workers. Born on 31 December 1885 in Brisbane, she died on 14 May 1974 in St Kilda.

Political activism 
She was a member of the Political Labor Council in Richmond, Victoria and attended the first Victorian Labor Women's Conference in 1909. During World War I she campaigned against conscription and was a committee member of the Workers' Educational Association. Between 1921 and 1923 she was the Secretary for the Australian Relief Fund for Stricken Europe and in the following two years visited Russia and worked for a short period in Geneva for the International Labour Organisation. In 1925 she attended the first British Commonwealth Labour Conference in London, representing the Melbourne Trades Hall Council. Between 1926 and 1927 she was a member of the Australian Labor Party, helping to establish the Labor Guild of Youth, and stood unsuccessfully in the Boroondara by-election in 1933.

Notable works 
 Are Women Taking Men's Jobs? (1935)
 Equal Pay for the Sexes  (1948)
 Arbitration at the Cross Roads (1954)

Recognition 
In 1978 a street in the Canberra suburb of Chisholm was named Heagney Crescent in her honour, while in 2001 she was inducted into the Victorian Honour Roll of Women.

References 

Australian trade unionists
1885 births
1974 deaths
19th-century Australian women
20th-century Australian women